The June Days uprising was an uprising staged by French civilians from 22 to 26 June 1848. It was in response to plans to close the National Workshops, created by the Second Republic in order to provide work and a minimal source of income for the unemployed. The National Guard, led by General Louis-Eugène Cavaignac, was called out to quell the rebellion. Over 10,000 people were either killed or injured, while 4,000 insurgents were deported to French Algeria. The uprising marked the end of the hopes of a "Democratic and Social Republic" and the victory of the liberals over the Radical Republicans.

Background
Louis Philippe's July monarchy oversaw a period of internal turmoil in France. The provisional government of the French Second Republic was declared after the abdication of the king in February, which immediately enacted democratic reforms such as universal male suffrage. To combat unemployment, the Second Republic funded the National Workshops, which provided jobs and wages, through new taxes applied to landowners. Higher taxes alienated land owners and peasants, who subsequently opposed the national workshops. As a result, these land taxes were flouted, leading to a financial crisis for the Second Republic.

On 23 April 1848, a mainly moderate and conservative constituent assembly was elected, which was opposed by the Parisian public and radicals. Insurgents then invaded of the assembly to prevent their democratic republic from being "eroded away". The invasion was quickly thwarted; however, it sparked fear in conservatives, who had gained majority seats in the constituent assembly. Ultimately, the conservatives closed down the National Workshops, a decision which sparked the June uprising.

Uprising

On 23 June, Comte de Falloux's committee issued a decree stating that the Workshops would be closed in three days, and that although young men could join the army, provincials would have to return home or they could simply be dismissed. Outrage surrounding the closing of the Workshops increased, and culminated into an uprising. In sections of the city, hundreds of barricades were built which blocked transportation and reduced mobility. The National Guard was called out to halt the riot, but resulted into a clash between the guard and the protestors.

Insurgents consisted of labourers who had built barricades out of broken stones. The strength of the National Guard was estimated to be over 40,000 guards; however, they were outnumbered by insurgents as they gained strength by recruiting citizens from their homes or forcing them to join. The insurgents also seized many armories to gather weaponry.

Aftermath
By 26 June, the uprising was over, resulting in the death or injury of around 10,000 people, including the deaths of about 1,500 troops and about 3,000 insurgents. A notable casualty was Denis Auguste Affre, the Archbishop of Paris, who was killed during peace negotiations. The Archbishop was led to believe that his presence at the barricades might be the means of restoring peace. He accordingly applied to General Cavaignac, who warned him of the risk he was about to incur. Soon afterwards, the firing having ceased at his request, he appeared on the barricade at the entrance to the Faubourg Saint-Antoine, accompanied by M. Albert, of the national guard, who wore the dress of a workingman, and bore a green branch as a sign of peace, and by Tellier, a devoted servant. Very shortly after, shots were heard, and the insurgents hastily returned fire towards the National Guard, thinking they were betrayed, killing the archbishop in the cross fire. The Archbishop's public funeral occurred on 7 July.

After the insurgents were crushed and arrested en masse, over 4,000 insurgents were deported to Algeria, and all hopes of a revolution were abandoned. 

Five months following the June Uprising, the French Constitution of 1848 was adopted, handing executive powers to the president with a 4-year term of office, allowing him to appoint Ministers and other high-ranking officials. The constitution also provided provision for an Assembly of 750 legislators, for which public elections would take place every three years. After the constitution was enacted, the 1848 French presidential election were held and Louis-Napoleon Bonaparte was elected. After three years in power, Bonaparte staged a coup d'état, extending his mandate for ten years; he went on to establish the Second French Empire.

See also
 French Revolution of 1848
 History of the Left in France
 The Eighteenth Brumaire of Louis Napoleon

References

External links

 Marx & Engels articles published from June to November 1848 in the Neue Rheinische Zeitung
 Les journées de juin 1848, K. Marx – F. Engels.

1840s in Paris
Rebellions in France
Labor disputes in France
French Second Republic
1848 in France
1848 labor disputes and strikes
June 1848 events
Insurgencies in Paris